Nicola Raffaele Guglielmelli (born 23 July 1997) is a German footballer who plays as a midfielder for SC Pfullendorf. He also holds Italian citizenship.

Club career

Hellas Verona

Loan to Prato 
On 25 July 2017, Guglielmelli was signed by Serie C side Prato on a season-long loan deal. On 27 August he made his Serie C debut for Prato in a 3–1 away defeat against Viterbese Castrense, he was replaced by Matteo Cavagna in the 63rd minute. On 10 September, Guglielmelli scored his first professional goal in the 42nd minute of a 1–1 away draw against Cuneo. On 24 September he played his first entire match for Prato, a 1–0 home win over Gavorrano. Guglielmelli ended his season-long loan to Prato with 24 appearances and one goal, but Prato was relegated in Serie D.

Mantova 
On 14 September 2018, Guglielmelli joined to Serie D club Mantova on a free-transfer and a one-year contract. On 30 September he made his debut for Mantova as a substitute replacing Sante Giacinti in the 69th minute of a 1–0 away win over U.S.D. Scanzorosciate. Two weeks later, on 14 October, Guglielmelli played his first match as a starter for Mantova, a 2–1 away win over GSD Ambrosiana, however he was replaced only after 35 minutes by David Yeboah. Guglielmelli ended this season with only nine appearances, including one as a starter, and one assist. His contract was not renewed after this season.

Rielasingen-Arlen 
On 14 August 2019, Guglielmelli signed for Oberliga Baden-Württemberg club Rielasingen-Arlen on a free-transfer.

Career statistics

Club

References

External links
 

Living people
1997 births
People from Lörrach
Sportspeople from Freiburg (region)
German sportspeople of Italian descent
German footballers
Footballers from Baden-Württemberg
Association football midfielders
Serie C players
Hellas Verona F.C. players
A.C. Prato players
SC Pfullendorf players
German expatriate footballers
German expatriate sportspeople in Switzerland
Expatriate footballers in Switzerland